The twospot hogfish (Bodianus bimaculatus) is a species of wrasse native to the Indo-Pacific from Madagascar to New Caledonia and from Japan to New Zealand. It can be found in the aquarium trade.

References

Twospot hogfish
Taxa named by Gerald R. Allen
Fish described in 1973